Platygryllus is a genus of crickets in the subfamily Gryllinae.  Records of species distribution (probably incomplete) include Africa, southern Europe and in Asia: India, Java and the Philippines.

Mating behaviour
Males of this genus transfer sperm to the female via a spermatophore which is externally attached to a females ovipositor. Male P. supplicans guard females after spermatophore transfer to prevent the female from removing his spermatophore prematurely. The females of P. primiformis use premature spermatophore removal as a form of cryptic female choice leaving larger males' spermatophores attached for significantly longer than smaller males.

Species
The Orthoptera Species File includes:
 Platygryllus arambourgi (Chopard, 1938)
 Platygryllus atratulus (Walker, 1869)
 Platygryllus atritus Otte & Cade, 1984
 Platygryllus capensis Otte & Cade, 1984
 Platygryllus cockbilli (Chopard, 1954)
 Platygryllus congolensis Gorochov, 1984
 Platygryllus ignobilis (Walker, 1869)
 Platygryllus longus (Gorochov, 1988)
 Platygryllus maurus (Afzelius & Brannius, 1804)
 Platygryllus melanocephalus (Serville, 1838)
 Platygryllus nefandus (Kirby, 1906)
 Platygryllus olsufievi (Gorochov, 1988)
 Platygryllus orlovskajae (Gorochov, 1988)
 Platygryllus ovum (Gorochov, 1988)
 Platygryllus primiformis Otte & Cade, 1984
 Platygryllus quadristrigatus (Saussure, 1877) - 'type species (as Gryllus quadristrigatus Saussure)
 Platygryllus satunini (Gorochov, 1988)
 Platygryllus serengeticus Otte & Cade, 1984
 Platygryllus subalatus (Chopard, 1951)
 Platygryllus sudanus (Gorochov, 1988)
 Platygryllus xanthocercus'' François & Defaut, 2018

References

Crickets
Ensifera genera